Mariana Castillo Deball (born in 1975, Mexico City) is a Mexican visual artist. She works primarily in installation, sculpture, photography and drawing.

Biography 
She studied in the Universidad Nacional Autónoma de México, Mexico City and the Jan Van Eyck Academie in Maastricht. She is currently based in Berlin. In 2009, she was awarded the Ars Viva prize, which has been presented by the Kulturkreis der deutschen Wirtschaft im BDI (Association of Arts and Culture of the German Economy at the Federation of German Industries) every year since 1953, and is awarded to young visual artists who live and work in Germany.

Castillo Deball uses installation, sculpture, photography, and drawing to explore the role objects play in our understanding of identity and history. Engaging in prolonged periods of research and field work, she takes on the role of the explorer or the archaeologist, compiling found materials in a way that reveals new connections and meanings. In Castillo Deball's 2013 work Stelae Storage, plaster casts copied from monolithic Mayan stone sculptures called stelae are displayed on metal racks similar to those found in a museum's storage area. In a similar work, Lost Magic Kingdoms Paolozzi (2013), Castillo Deball culled photographic reproductions from the personal archives of late Scottish artist Eduardo Paolozzi, who mixed pop and ethnographic references. The works presented in her 2019 solo exhibition Replaying Life's Tape at the Monash University Museum of Art, Melbourne, derive from the Ediacaran fossils from the Ediacara Hills, South Australia. Incorporating methods of scientific display systems into her prints and installations, Castillo Deball considers the contested relationship between time, site, and history.

Castillo Deball has been included in solo and group exhibitions in Europe and North America including the 2015 solo exhibition ¿Quién medirá el espacio, quién me dirá el momento? at the Museo de Arte Contemporáneo (MACO) in Oaxaca, the 54th Biennale di Venezia, Sharjah Biennial 12, Sharjah, United Arab Emirates, and in dOCUMENTA, Kassel, Germany. Castillo Deball's monograph and artist's book, Uncomfortable Objects, was published in 2012. In 2012, she was awarded the Zurich Art Prize.

References

External links
 Official website 
Mariana Castillo Deball at Kurimanzutto
 Chisenhale Gallery, Mariana Castillo Deball, What we caught we threw away, what we didn't catch we kept
 Interview with the artist
 The Independent,Thursday 30 October 2014
 Mariana Castillo Deball on Artnet
 MOLAA Project Room, Between You and the Image of You that Reaches Me

1975 births
Living people
Mexican contemporary artists